The men's 15 kilometre freestyle pursuit cross-country skiing competition at the 1994 Winter Olympics in Lillehammer, Norway, was held on 19 February at Birkebeineren Ski Stadium in Lillehammer. The Norwegian Bjørn Dæhlie was the 1993 World champion and the 1992 Olympic champion. 

Each skier started based on the results from the 10 km classical event, skiing the entire 15 kilometre course after the first-to-finish principle. Bjørn Dæhlie of Norway started first in the race with a gap of 18.2 seconds to Vladimir Smirnov of Kazakhstan. Dæhlie extended his lead and won over Smirnov with 29.2 seconds; his second consecutive olympic gold medal in the pursuit event.

Results
The time consists the added times for both the 10 km classical and the 15 km freestyle pursuit.

References

External links
 Final results (International Ski Federation)

Men's cross-country skiing at the 1994 Winter Olympics
Men's pursuit cross-country skiing at the Winter Olympics